Canadian Paralympics may refer to:

 1976 Summer Paralympics, in Toronto, Ontario
 2010 Winter Paralympics, in Vancouver, B.C.
 Canadian Paralympic Committee (CPC)
 Canada at the Paralympics
 Canadian Paralympic Athletics Championships
 2005 Canadian Paralympic Athletics Championships

See also
 2015 Parapan American Games, the 2015 Pan Am "paralympic" Games, in Toronto, Ontario
 Canadian olympics (disambiguation) 
 Canadian Pan Am Games (disambiguation)
 Canadian Commonwealth Games (disambiguation)
 Special Olympics Canada